The Squash - Single Men competition at the World Games 2009 took place from July 21 to July 24, at the Chung Cheng Martial Arts Stadium in Kaohsiung, Taiwan.

Seeds

Draw

Note: * w/d = Withdraw, * w/o = Walkover, * r = Retired

References

Men
Squash records and statistics